Middle Town may refer to:

Middle Town, California, United States
Middle Town, St Agnes - a settlement on the island of St Agnes in the Isles of Scilly, of the English coast
Middle Town, St Martin's - a settlement on the island of St Martin's in the Isles of Scilly, of the English coast
Szczecin-Srodmiescie, Poland ("Middle Town" in Polish)

See also
Middletown (disambiguation)